Kariz-e Now (also Romanized as Kārīz-e Now, Kārīz-i-Nau, and Kārīz Now; also known as Kahrīz-e Now and Kārez-i-Nau) is a village in Karizan Rural District, Nasrabad District, Torbat-e Jam County, Razavi Khorasan Province, Iran. At the 2006 census, its population was 2,126, in 519 families.

References 

Populated places in Torbat-e Jam County